Florida's 4th Senate District elects one member of the Florida Senate. The district consists of Nassau county and part of Duval county, in the U.S. state of Florida. The current Senator is Republican Clay Yarborough.

List of Senators 

NOTE: The following Information was gathered from the Florida Senate website. Only records of senators from 1998-present are kept.

Elections 
NOTE: The following results were gathered from the Florida Department of State. Uncontested election results are not provided.

1978

1982

1986

1990

1992

1994

1998

2002

2012

2018

2022

References
Florida Senate districts